William Soeryadjaya, a.k.a. Tjia Kian Liong (December 20, 1922 – April 2, 2010), also known as Oom (Uncle) Willem, born in Majalengka, was a Chinese Indonesian businessman who co-founded Astra International, Indonesia's largest conglomerate.

He lost his parents at the age of 12 and had to cease his education at 19. But he continued his education in later years and studied at Leder & Schoenindustrie in the Netherlands.

Soeryadjaya co-founded Astra, then a trading company, with his brother, Tjia Kian Tie, in 1957. The company grew to become Indonesia's largest automobile retailer and the country's biggest company by market value. The company, which also owns finance, plantation, auto parts manufacturing, heavy machinery and mining services and automotive businesses, sells Honda motorcycles, BMW, Daihatsu, Peugeot, Citroën and Toyota vehicles throughout Indonesia. In March 2010, Astra overtook Telkom Indonesia to become Indonesia's most valuable company.

Soeryadjaya lost control of Astra in 1992, when he sold most of his family's shares to rescue his eldest son's (Edward Soeryadjaya) Summa Bank, which had suffered from a credit crisis and finally collapsed. He personally guaranteed all Summa Bank depositors their money back, and all depositors received their money back with interest without using any bailout package from the government at the expense of his ownership in Astra.

In 2009, Forbes magazine rated the Soeryadjaya family as Indonesia's 18th-wealthiest family.

William Soeryadjaya died in Jakarta on April 2, 2010, at the age of 87 and was buried in San Diego Hills in the following days.

References

External links
Jakarta Post: William Soeryadjaya, a Modest Businessman, Dies at 87 

1922 births
2010 deaths
Indonesian Christians
Indonesian billionaires
Indonesian businesspeople
Indonesian philanthropists
Indonesian people of Chinese descent
People from Jakarta
William
People from Majalengka Regency
20th-century philanthropists
Indonesian expatriates in the Netherlands